What If, sometimes stylized as What If…?, is a comic book anthology series published by Marvel Comics whose stories explore how the Marvel Universe might have unfolded if key moments in its history had not occurred as they did in mainstream continuity. Since What If debuted in 1977, the comics have been published in 13 series as well as occasional stand-alone issues.

In 2021, an animated series based on the What If comics premiered on Disney+, set in the Marvel Cinematic Universe's multiverse.

Format
The stories of the inaugural series (1977–1984) feature the alien Uatu, the Watcher as a narrator. From his base on the Moon, Uatu observes both Earth and alternate realities.

Most What If stories begin with Uatu describing an event in the mainstream Marvel Universe, then introducing a point of divergence in that event and then describing the consequences of the divergence. Some stories diverge from another divergence, such as What If Vol 1 #43 (Conan the Barbarian remains in the modern era), which diverges from #13 (Conan travels to then returns from the modern era).

Uatu was used similarly in the second series (1989–1998) until a point where, in the Fantastic Four comic book, Uatu was punished for destroying another Watcher. This made the use of Uatu improbable, so the character was phased out to its last appearance in issue #76. Without a framing device, the stories themselves became the focus.

In later series, some writers chose to introduce alternative narrators. For example, in volume 3, in What If Karen Page Had Lived?, What If Jessica Jones Had Joined the Avengers? and in Daredevil (2005), Brian Michael Bendis, the writer himself, makes a cameo as narrator. In the early 2006 series, a hacker, whose online alias is "the Watcher", opens each of the six issues.

Marvel has given several What If stories official numerical designations to make them contiguous with the Marvel Multiverse and differentiate them from the main Marvel Universe of Earth-616.

Marvel Comics occasionally issued backup features, Untold Tales from the Marvel Universe. These stories explained the origins of some of Marvel's superhuman species.

Publication history

Volume 1
The initial 47-issue series ran from February 1977 to October 1984. The first What If story was "What If Spider-Man had Joined the "Fantastic Four?". It presented an alternate version of events seen in The Amazing Spider-Man #1 (1963). What If #24, which is titled "What If Gwen Stacy had lived?" and focuses on the consequences of Spider-Man's secret identity being publicly exposed, is one of the most highly regarded What If stories.

List of What If? stories

Special 
Following the cancellation of the original series, Marvel published a one-shot What If? Special (June 1988) with the story "What If Iron Man Had Been a Traitor?". It is collected in What If? Into the Multiverse Omnibus Vol 1.

Volume 2
From July 1989 to November 1998, Marvel published 115 monthly What If issues (114 issues plus a #-1 issue) the second series revisited and revised ideas from volume 1. In volume 2, stories could span multiple issues (every issue of volume 1 contained a complete story). Also, sometimes, the volume 2 stories would offer multiple plots and endings and the reader could decide which one to adopt. For example, in What If the War Machine had not destroyed the Living Laser?, three endings were offered.

The humorous aspect of volume 1 was retained through volume 2, particularly in issue #34, an all-humor issue containing a number of single-page gags and two complete stories.

Starting with issue #87, the issue titles stopped being questions that were answered by the story, and instead the covers were presented as "What If? Starring…" whatever character was being highlighted in the given issue.

In issue #105, What If introduced Spider-Girl (Mayday Parker); the new character was popular enough for a spin-off series. From this, the MC2 line of publications were developed.

For a brief period between 1995 and 1996, all What If? stories were labeled as Marvel Alterniverse which included the likes of Ruins, The Last Avengers Story and Punisher Kills the Marvel Universe.

List of What If? (vol. 2) stories

Volume 3
In February 2005, Marvel published a further six issues of What If. They were all in the "one-shot" format. The editor, Justin Gabrie, attributed the publication of volume 3 to a suggestion from C. B. Cebulski.

Marvel published a single parody edition called Wha...Huh?!? in August 2005.

 What If Jessica Jones Had Joined The Avengers? 
 What If Karen Page Had Lived? 
 What If Aunt May Had Died Instead Of Uncle Ben? 
 What If Dr. Doom Had Become The Thing? 
 What If Magneto Had Formed The X-Men With Professor X? 
 What If General Ross Had Become The Hulk?

Volume 4
In February 2006, publication of volume 4 began. Again, there were six issues in the "one-shot" format. However, rather than follow What if tradition of using a divergence from a specific plot point, Volume 4 more closely resembled the DC Comics equivalent, Elseworlds, which presents stories that are continuities based on alternate versions (in time or place) of canon (for example, Superman: Red Son is a story in which Superman was raised in the Soviet Union instead of the United States) all but one of the volume 4 issues uses this format, explained by Uatu the Watcher having discovered historical documents from an alternative dimension. From the Japanese feudal era, the divergence of a shared alternate universe, Earth-717, begins. This divergence is the time when a Daredevil hero known as "the Devil Who Dares" appears. It is also the realm where characters are given alternative life histories and where they proceed in alternative historical periods.

Examples from volume 4 include Captain America battling the "White Skull" during the American Civil War; Wolverine taking on the role of the Punisher and fighting mobsters in 1920s Prohibition-era Chicago; Namor the Sub-Mariner being raised by his father on the surface during World War II; Thor becoming a herald of Galactus; and a Soviet version of the Fantastic Four, known as the "Ultimate Federalist Freedom Fighters" (consisting of Rudion Richards, Colossus, Magik and the Widow Maker), during the Cold War.

 What If...Captain America fought in the Civil War? 
 What If...the Fantastic Four were Cosmonauts? 
 What If...Daredevil lived in feudal Japan? 
 What If...Namor grew up on land? 
 What If...Thor was a herald of Galactus? 
 What If...Wolverine was Public Enemy No. 1 in mob-ridden 1920s Chicago?

Volume 5
In 2006, Marvel published another set of What If? issues, including one based on the Spider-Man story "The Other".

 What If? Avengers Disassembled #1: "Witchhunt: What if the Scarlet Witch hadn't acted alone?"
 What If? Spider-Man The Other #1: "What if Spider-Man had rejected the Spider? Poison Selves"
 What If? Wolverine Enemy of the State #1: "What if Wolverine was never Deprogrammed? Bite the Hand that Feeds"
 What If? X-Men Age of Apocalypse #1: …What If Legion Had Killed Xavier and Magneto?"
 What If? X-Men Deadly Genesis #1: "What If Xavier's Secret Second Team Had Survived?"

Volume 6
Volume 6 consists of five issues (2007–2008). A sixth, "What If: This Was the Fantastic Four", featuring Spider-Man, Wolverine, Ghost Rider and Hulk, was to be released in November 2007, but it was withheld due to the death of Mike Wieringo. What If: This Was the Fantastic Four was released as a tribute to Wieringo in June 2008 as a 48-page special. All its proceeds went to the Hero Initiative.

The other issues were: 

 What If?: Planet Hulk (October 2007) 
 What If?: Annihilation (November 2007) 
 What If?: Civil War (December 2007)
 What If? X-Men: Rise and Fall of the Shi'ar Empire (December 2007)
 What If? Spider-Man vs. Wolverine (January 2008) 

These issues were collected into a trade paperback, What If...? Civil War.

Volume 7
In December 2008, Marvel published five What If specials which appeared weekly. They included: Fallen Son: The Death of Captain America, House of M, Spider-Man: Back in Black, and Secret Wars. A new "Fantastic Four" consisted of the Hulk, Spider-Man, Iron Man, and Wolverine. In addition, a story line featuring the Runaways as the Young Avengers ran throughout Volume 7.

 What If? House of M #1: "What If...Scarlet Witch Ended the 'House of M' By Saying, 'No More Power?'" (February 2009)
 What If? Fallen Son #1: "What If...Iron Man Had Died?" (February 2009)
 What If? Newer Fantastic Four #1: "What If...Newer Fantastic Four?" (February 2009)
 What If? Spider-Man Back in Black #1: "What If...Mary Jane Had Been Shot Instead of Aunt May?" (February 2009)
 What If? Secret Wars #1: "What If Doctor Doom Kept the Beyonder's Power?" (February 2009)

Volume 8
In December 2009, a new series was published. Volume 8 focused on three recent events in the Marvel Universe, including the Spider-Man: House of M miniseries and the "World War Hulk" and "Secret Invasion" story lines. There was also an edition focusing on the Astonishing X-Men series and a classic What If? about Daredevil and Elektra. With the exception of this last issue, each comic in Volume 8 featured two alternatives for the event.

 What If? Secret Invasion #1: "What if the Skrulls succeeded in their Secret Invasion?" (February 2010)
 What If? World War Hulk #1: "What If The Heroes Lost World War Hulk?" (February 2010)
 What If? Daredevil Vs. Elektra #1: "What If Daredevil Died Saving Elektra?" (February 2010)
 What If? Astonishing X-Men #1: "What If Ord Resurrected Jean Grey Instead of Colossus?": (February 2010)
 What If? Spider-Man: House of M #1: "What If... Gwen Stacy Survived The House of M?" (February 2010)

Volume 9
In September 2010, Marvel announced a ninth series of five What If issues in the one-shot format, to be released in December 2010. The second to fifth issues of volume 9 were not numbered.

 What If? Iron Man: Demon in an Armor #1: "What If Tony Stark Had Become Doctor Doom?" (February 2011)
 What If? Wolverine: Father #1: "Wolverine: Father" (February 2011)
 What If? Spider-Man #1: "What If? Spider-Man Killed Kraven the Hunter?" (February 2011)
 What If? Dark Reign #1 (February 2011)
 Venom/Deadpool: What If? #1 (April 2011)

What If? #200 was an extra-sized edition featuring two stories. It presented an alternative for the Siege Marvel Universe event, asking what might have happened if the Sentry had not lost control and Norman Osborn had conquered Asgard. The second story examined "The Galactus Trilogy", and was written by Stan Lee, the author of the original.

Volume 10
On March 22, 2013, Marvel's editor-in-chief Axel Alonso revealed to Comic Book Resources that What If…? was coming back with What If…? Avengers vs. X-Men, a four-issue limited series written by Jimmy Palmiotti and illustrated by Jorge Molina.

Volume 11
In April 2014, Marvel released the five-issue series What If? Age of Ultron, which spun out of the 2013 event and examined the consequences of Wolverine going back in time to kill Hank Pym before he created Ultron. Each issue explored what a new universe would be like which arose from the removal of another core Avenger, with the Wasp in #1, Iron Man in #2, Thor in #3 and Captain America in #4. The series was concluded in #5 with a world where Hank Pym never created Ultron in the first place and thus, a universe without Ultron's creation of the Vision.

Volume 12
In October 2015, Marvel released another five-part series of stories under the What If? banner, this time focused on the 2013 story line "Infinity", which saw the Avengers, the Guardians of the Galaxy, the Inhumans and other groups dealing with a combined threat of a universal incursion by the race the Builders, and an attack on Earth by Thanos and his forces. Each issue is a self-contained story, and the first four explore a different outcome to the event. The fifth, What If? Infinity: Dark Reign, presents a world in which Norman Osborn and the Dark Avengers had acquired the Infinity Gauntlet during the 2008 - 09 "Dark Reign" story line.

 What If? Infinity: Thanos 
 What If? Infinity: Inhumans 
 What If? Infinity: X-Men 
 What If? Infinity: Guardians Of The Galaxy 
 What If? Infinity: Dark Reign

Volume 13
In October 2018, Marvel released six more one-shots under the What If? banner, as well as several $1.00 True Believer reprints of classic What If? issues.

 What If? Spider-Man Vol. 2 (2018)
 What If? X-Men Vol. 1 (2018)
 What If? The Punisher Vol. 1 (2018)
 What If? Ghost Rider Vol. 1 (2018)
 What If? Thor Vol. 1 (2018)
 What If? Magik Vol. 1 (2018)

Spider-Man: Spider's Shadow 
In 2021, Marvel published a five-issue miniseries titled Spider-Man: Spider’s Shadow, detailing what if Peter Parker fully accepted the alien symbiote and became Venom. While it did not have the title of What If?, it did have the branding on the cover.

Volume 14 
In 2022, Marvel published a five-issue miniseries exploring what would happen if Miles Morales had acquired the powers of different Marvel super-heroes. The first four issues saw him become Captain America, Wolverine, Hulk, and Thor, and the final issue was a team-up of the four divergent Miles.

Bibliography

Collected editions

In other media
The What If comic series has been adapted several times throughout the Marvel Cinematic Universe (MCU):
 The TV series Agents of S.H.I.E.L.D. season 4 features a story arc which is loosely inspired by the What If series, with the first episode of the arc being called "What If…". The scenario is a virtual creation, called the Framework, by Holden Radcliffe and his A.I. assistant AIDA. In this case, it depicts the drastically different lives of the S.H.I.E.L.D. team members.
 In 2021, Marvel Studios produced an animated series based on the comics titled What If…?, premiering on Disney+. Various MCU actors reprise their roles, with the series being narrated by the Watcher (voiced by Jeffrey Wright).

See also
 Canon (fiction)
 Elseworlds
 Multiverse (Marvel Comics)
 Intercompany crossover
 What The--?!
 Not Brand Echh

References

External links
 
 
 
 

Marvel Comics dimensions
1989 comics debuts
1977 comics debuts
Comics by Roy Thomas
Comics about multiple time paths